Osmanlı, historically Babilge, is a village in the Şahinbey District, Gaziantep Province, Turkey. The village had a population of 3912 in 2022.

References

Villages in Şahinbey District